Valle Hovin is both a bandy and speed skating rink in cold weather, and an outdoor stadium for concerts in warm weather, in Oslo, Norway.

Located in the residential area Valle-Hovin, in amongst trees and a park, one finds Valle Hovin. It is reachable from the Lines 1, 2, 3, and 4 reaching the Helsfyr station of the Oslo T-bane metro system, and additionally via two bus lines as well as substantial parking for automobiles.

As a concert venue Valle Hovin can hold at least 40,000 people, many of whom stand on the concrete floor where the rink is laid in winter. Many internationally famous popular music acts have appeared there, the first one being Tina Turner on 20 June 1987. Prior to a June 1995 expansion, the concert capacity was 30,000. As a concert venue it is not always thought of as best, due to lack of seating and limited sightlines once well back in the crowd, but it offers larger capacity than the indoor Oslo Spektrum and is sometimes deemed preferable to Ullevaal Stadion due to having a concrete floor that cannot be damaged by stage and moving equipment as can that football ground's more delicate turf.

It was the main arena for the Bandy World Championship 1985.

Concerts
Tina Turner – 20 June 1987, 20 May 1990 & 6 August 2000
Deep Purple – 22 August 1987
Bruce Springsteen & The E Street Band – 1988, 1993, 1999, 2003 & twice in 2008, 2012
Pink Floyd – 2 August 1988 & 29–30 August 1994
Prince – 14 August 1988
Van Halen – 28 August 1988
The Rolling Stones – 6–7 August 1990, 9 June 1995, 2 August 1998 & 8 August 2007
Michael Jackson – 15 July 1992 & 19 August 1997
Dire Straits – 30 July 1992
U2 – 29 July 1993, with PJ Harvey & Stereo MC's, 6 August 1997 & 27 July 2005, with Paddy Casey & Razorlight
Guns N' Roses – 10 June 1993 & 19 July 2018
Paul McCartney – 14 June 2004
Metallica – 10 July 2007 & 23 May 2012
Iron Maiden – 24 July 2008
AC/DC – 15 June 2009, 30 May 2010, 17 July 2015
Madonna – 28–30 July 2009

External links

 Official website for the bandy and speed skating rink (in Norwegian)
 IORR description of Rolling Stones concert there
 Review of the Iron Maiden concert there

Buildings and structures in Oslo
Speed skating venues in Norway
Bandy venues in Norway
Sports venues in Oslo
Music venues in Oslo
Year of establishment missing